Agona West is one of the constituencies represented in the Parliament of Ghana. It elects one Member of Parliament (MP) by the first past the post system of election. Agona West constituency is located in the Agona district of the Central Region of Ghana.

Boundaries
The seat is located entirely within the Agona district of the Central Region of Ghana.

Members of Parliament

Elections
Samuel Kweku Obodai, the current MP for the Agona West constituency was elected in 2000 and retained his seat in the 2004 and 2008 Ghanaian parliamentary election elections.

See also
List of Ghana Parliament constituencies
Agona District

References 

Parliamentary constituencies in the Central Region (Ghana)